Walram (c. 1305 – 1380) was a German nobleman of the House of Sponheim. He succeeded his father Simon II, Count of Sponheim-Kreuznach.

House of Sponheim
1300s births
1380 deaths
Counts of Germany